1080 was a leap year of the Julian calendar.

1080 may also refer to:

Science and technology
 1080i, a video mode with 1080 lines of vertical resolution interlaced
 1080p, a video mode with 1080 lines of vertical resolution with progressive scan
 GeForce GTX 1080, a graphics processing unit designed by Nvidia
 Sodium fluoroacetate, a chemical compound known in pesticide form as '1080'

Other uses
 Euro1080, a European television broadcaster
 1080 (skateboarding), a skateboarding trick
 1080° Avalanche, a game for the Nintendo GameCube
 1080° Snowboarding, a game for the Nintendo 64
 1080 Dry Cider, a variety of Strongbow cider
 1080 6iX Perth, a Perth radio station